West Keating Township is a township in Clinton County, Pennsylvania, United States. The population was 16 at the 2020 census, down from 29 in 2010.

Geography
The township is located in westernmost Clinton County and is bordered to the northwest by Cameron County, to the southwest by Clearfield County, and to the southeast, across the West Branch Susquehanna River, by Centre County. East Keating Township is to the northeast.

Demographics

As of the census of 2020, there were 16 people and 11 households residing in the township. The population density was 1.1 people per square mile (0.4/km). There were 106 housing units at an average density of 4.4/sq mi (1.7/km). The racial makeup of the township was 97.62% White, and 2.38% from two or more races.

There were 19 households, out of which 10.5% had children under the age of 18 living with them, 57.9% were married couples living together, and 21.1% were non-families. 15.8% of all households were made up of individuals, and 15.8% had someone living alone who was 65 years of age or older. The average household size was 2.21 and the average family size was 2.33.

In the township the population was spread out, with 9.5% under the age of 18, 19.0% from 25 to 44, 45.2% from 45 to 64, and 26.2% who were 65 years of age or older. The median age was 59 years. For every 100 females, there were 133.3 males. For every 100 females age 18 and over, there were 123.5 males.

The median income for a household in the township was $23,750, and the median income for a family was $37,500. Males had a median income of $52,500 versus $16,875 for females. The per capita income for the township was $17,224. There were 14.3% of families and 17.1% of the population living below the poverty line, including no under eighteens and 16.7% of those over 64.

References

Populated places established in 1805
Townships in Clinton County, Pennsylvania
Townships in Pennsylvania
1805 establishments in Pennsylvania